Uladzislau Dzmitryievich Pramau (born 3 August 1984) is a Belarusian long distance runner who specialises in the marathon. He competed in the men's marathon event at the 2016 Summer Olympics. In 2019, he competed in the men's marathon at the 2019 World Athletics Championships held in Doha, Qatar. He finished in 53rd place.

References

External links
 

1984 births
Living people
Belarusian male long-distance runners
Belarusian male marathon runners
Athletes (track and field) at the 2016 Summer Olympics
Olympic athletes of Belarus
World Athletics Championships athletes for Belarus
Sportspeople from Gomel